Up a Tree is a 1955 animated short film produced by Walt Disney Productions and released by RKO Radio Pictures. The film stars Donald Duck and Chip 'n' Dale, with Donald trying to top a tree in which Chip and Dale are living. It was directed by Jack Hannah and features original music by Oliver Wallace.

Plot
Donald Duck is a lumberjack who sets out to top a tall tree on a hill. The tree turns out to be the home of chipmunks Chip 'n' Dale, who do whatever it takes to protect their tree. Chip starts by unhooking the harness holding Donald to the tree, causing him to fall. Confused, Donald scales the tree again and returns to work. This time, Chip is able to push the harness cord into the cutting path of Donald’s saw. Although a branch breaks his fall, Dale drops an acorn on Donald’s head causing him to fall back to the ground.

After kicking the tree in frustration, a more determined Donald climbs back up the tree with a heavy chain wrapped around his waist. This time he succeeds in topping the tree, but thanks again to the chicanery of the chipmunks he finds himself falling back to the ground. To add insult, the top of the tree he cut lands on top of him.

After he gets out from under the topped tree, quipping "How do you like those apples?", Donald discovers the chipmunks are mocking his plight and he once again scales the tree, this time determined to get revenge on Chip and Dale. Donald fails yet again, resorting to violently chopping the tree with an axe to try and bring it down. Despite Chip and Dale's efforts, the tree falls and flips end over end landing on a log flume.

Using a pike pole, Donald catches a ride on the log and heads for the sawmill. Chip and Dale catch a ride in a toolbox on a zip line overhead. They ride ahead of Donald, jump from the tool box with a hammer, and dismantle a side of the flume with it. The log goes off the flume and toward the ground, leaving Donald to try and outrun it in his car and then, thanks again to Chip and Dale, on foot when the log crushes the vehicle. Finally, the log heads into a mine shaft and emerges on the other side with a box of dynamite atop it. Donald frantically tries to get away from the log as it approaches his home, frantically moves everything out of the log's way as it flies through the house.

The log manages to make it outside without damaging anything, and Donald breathes a sigh of relief thinking disaster has been avoided. What he does not realize is that the log got caught in the power lines behind the house and is precariously close to being catapulted back toward him. While Dale knocks on the door moments later to point this out to Donald, Chip climbs the log and moves the dynamite toward the direction of the house. Donald’s attempt to physically move the house out of the log’s path, predictably, fails and the log causes the house to explode on impact. As Donald watches, stunned with grief, Chip and Dale both laugh hysterically at his misfortune as the cartoon ends.

Voice cast
Clarence Nash as Donald Duck

Reception
In The Disney Films, Leonard Maltin described Up a Tree as one of the "funniest and fastest Donald Duck cartoons... a later effort that has one of the most frenzied string of gags ever concocted for a Disney cartoon."

Home media
The short was released on November 11, 2008 on Walt Disney Treasures: The Chronological Donald, Volume Four: 1951-1961.

Additional releases include:
Laserdisc - Chip 'N' Dale with Donald Duck
VHS - Chip 'N' Dale with Donald Duck
VHS - The Adventures Of Chip 'N' Dale
DVD - Chip 'n' Dale : Volume 1 : Here Comes Trouble

Television
The short was included in House of Mouse episode "Chip 'n' Dale".

References

External links
Up a Tree at the Encyclopedia of Animated Disney Shorts

1955 films
1955 animated films
Donald Duck short films
1950s Disney animated short films
Films about trees
Films about lumberjacks
Films directed by Jack Hannah
Films produced by Walt Disney
Logging
Films scored by Oliver Wallace
1950s English-language films
1950s American films
Chip 'n' Dale films